Teixeirópolis is a municipality located in the Brazilian state of Rondônia. Its population was 4,233 (2020) and its area is 460 km², which makes it the smallest municipality in that state.

References

Municipalities in Rondônia